The 1987 Volvo U.S. National Indoor was a men's tennis tournament played on indoor hard courts at the Racquet Club of Memphis in Memphis, Tennessee in the United States that was part of the 1987 Nabisco Grand Prix. It was the 17th edition of the tournament was held from February 9 through February 15, 1987. First-seeded Stefan Edberg won the singles title after his opponent in the final, second-seeded Jimmy Connors retired in the second set with a knee injury.

Finals

Singles
 Stefan Edberg defeated  Jimmy Connors 6–3, 2–1, ret.
 It was Edberg's 2nd singles title of the year and the 10th of his career.

Doubles
 Anders Järryd /  Jonas Svensson defeated  Sergio Casal /  Emilio Sánchez 6–4, 6–2

References

External links
 ITF tournament edition details

Volvo U.S. National Indoor
U.S. National Indoor Championships
Tennis in Tennessee
Volvo U.S. National Indoor
Volvo U.S. National Indoor
Volvo U.S. National Indoor